CD28 (Cluster of Differentiation 28) is one of the proteins expressed on T cells that provide co-stimulatory signals required for T cell activation and survival. T cell stimulation through CD28 in addition to the T-cell receptor (TCR) can provide a potent signal for the production of various interleukins  (IL-6 in particular).

CD28 is the receptor for CD80 (B7.1) and CD86 (B7.2) proteins. When activated by Toll-like receptor ligands, the CD80 expression is upregulated in antigen-presenting cells (APCs).  The CD86 expression on antigen-presenting cells is constitutive (expression is independent of environmental factors).

CD28 is the only B7 receptor constitutively expressed on naive T cells. Association of the TCR of a naive T cell with MHC:antigen complex without CD28:B7 interaction results in a T cell that is anergic.

Furthermore, CD28 was also identified on bone marrow stromal cells, plasma cells, neutrophils and eosinophils, but the functional importance of CD28 on these cells is not completely understood. It is generally reported, that CD28 is expressed on 50% of CD8+ T cells and more than 80% CD4+ T cells in human, but during the course of activation some T cells lose this molecule. Some antigen-experienced T cells lose CD28 and subsequently can be re-activated without CD28 engagement. These CD28− T cells have generally been characterized as antigen specific and terminally differentiated, and are often described as being memory T cells (TMs). In addition, the level of positive CD28 decreases with age.

As a homodimer of two chains with Ig domains binds B7 molecules on APCs and it can promotes T cells proliferation and differentiation, stimulates production of growth factors and induces the expression of anti-apoptotic proteins.
According to several studies, after birth, all human cells express CD28. But in adult, 20-30% of CD8+ T cells lose the ability of CD28 expression, whereas in the elderly (+80 years) up to 50-60% of CD8+ cells lose the ability of CD28 expression. But these statements only suggest that loss of CD28 expression marks functional differentiation to cytotoxic memory cells within clonal expansions.

In general, CD28 is a primary costimulatory molecule for T cell activation. But effective co-stimulation is essential only for some T cell activation. In this case, in the absence of co-stimulatory signals, the interaction of dendritic and T cells leads to T cell anergy. The importance of the costimulatory pathway is underlined by the fact that antagonists of co-stimulatory molecules disrupt the immune responses both in vitro and in vivo. But as mentioned earlier, during the course of activation e.g. TMs lose this molecule and assume a CD28-independent existence.

Signaling

CD28 possesses an intracellular domain with several residues that are critical for its effective signaling. The YMNM motif beginning at tyrosine 170 in particular is critical for the recruitment of SH2-domain containing proteins, especially PI3K, Grb2 and Gads. The Y170 residue is important for the induction of Bcl-xL via mTOR and enhancement of IL-2 transcription via PKCθ, but has no effect on proliferation and results a slight reduction in IL-2 production. The N172 residue (as part of the YMNM) is important for the binding of Grb2 and Gads and seems to be able to induce IL-2 mRNA stability but not NF-κB translocation. The induction of NF-κB seems to be much more dependent on the binding of Gads to both the YMNM and the two proline-rich motifs within the molecule. However, mutation of the final amino acid of the motif, M173, which is unable to bind PI3K but is able to bind Grb2 and Gads, gives little NF-κB or IL-2, suggesting that those Grb2 and Gads are unable to compensate for the loss of PI3K. IL-2 transcription appears to have two stages; a Y170-dependent, PI3K-dependent initial phase which allows transcription and a PI3K-independent second phase which is dependent on formation of an immune synapse, which results in enhancement of IL-2 mRNA stability. Both are required for full production of IL-2.

CD28 also contains two proline-rich motifs that are able to bind SH3-containing proteins. Itk and Tec are able to bind to the N-terminal of these two motifs which immediately succeeds the Y170 YMNM; Lck binds the C-terminal. Both Itk and Lck are able to phosphorylate the tyrosine residues which then allow binding of SH2 containing proteins to CD28. Binding of Tec to CD28 enhances IL-2 production, dependent on binding of its SH3 and PH domains to CD28 and PIP3 respectively.  The C-terminal proline-rich motif in CD28 is important for bringing Lck and lipid rafts into the immune synapse via filamin-A. Mutation of the two prolines within the C-terminal motif results in reduced proliferation and IL-2 production but normal induction of Bcl-xL. Phosphorylation of a tyrosine within the PYAP motif (Y191 in the mature human CD28) forms a high affinity-binding site for the SH2 domain of the src kinase Lck which in turn binds to the serine kinase PKC-θ.

Structure 

The first structure of CD28 was obtained in 2005 by the T-cell biology group at the University of Oxford.

The structure of the CD28 protein contains 220 amino acids, encoded by a gene consisting of four exons. It is a glycosylated, disulfide-linked homodimer of 44 kDa expressed on the cell surface. The structure contains paired domains of the V-set immunoglobulin superfamilies (IgSF). These domains are linked to individual transmembrane domains and cytoplasmic domains that contain critical signaling motifs. As CTLA4, CD28 share highly similar CDR3-analogous loops. In the CD28-CD80 complex, the two CD80 molecules converge such that their membrane proximal domains collide sterically, despite the availability of both ligand binding sites for CD28.

CD28 family members 
CD28 belongs into group members of a subfamily of costimulatory molecules that are characterized by an extracellular variable immunoglobulin-like domain. Members of this subfamily also include homologous receptors ICOS, CTLA4, PD1, PD1H, and BTLA. Nevertheless, only CD28 is expressed constitutively on mouse T cells, whereas ICOS and CTLA4 are induce by T cells receptor stimulation and in response to cytokines such as IL-2. CD28 and CTLA4 are very homologous and compete for the same ligand – CD80 and CD86. CTLA4 binds CD80 and CD86 always stronger than CD28, which allows CTLA4 to compete with CD28 for ligand and suppress effector T cells responses. But it was shown that CD28 and CTLA4 have opposite effect on the T cells stimulation. CD28 acts as a activator and CTLA4 acts as inhibitor. ICOS and CD28 are also closely related genes, but they cannot substitute from one another in function. The opposing roles of CD28 and ICOS compared to CTLA4 cause that these receptors act as a rheostat for the immune response through competitive pro- and anti-inflammatory effects.

As a drug target 

The drug TGN1412, which was produced by the German biotech company TeGenero, and unexpectedly caused multiple organ failure in trials, is a superagonist of CD28.  Unfortunately, it is often ignored that the same receptors also exist on cells other than lymphocytes. CD28 has also been found to stimulate eosinophil granulocytes where its ligation with anti-CD28 leads to the release of IL-2, IL4, IL-13 and IFN-γ.

It is known that CD28 and CTL4 may be critical regulators autoimmune diseases in mouse model. But there is less data from patients on the role of CD28 in human diseases.

Other potential drugs in pre-clinical development are agonist CD28 aptamers with immunostimulatory properties in a mouse tumor model, a monoclonal anti-CD28 Fab´ antibody FR104, or an octapeptide AB103, which prevents CD28 homodimerization.

Interactions 
CD28 has been shown to interact with:
 GRAP2,
 Grb2,  and
 PIK3R1.

See also 
 List of human clusters of differentiation

References

Further reading

External links 
 Mouse CD Antigen Chart
 Human CD Antigen Chart
 
 

Clusters of differentiation